

Kihnu Lighthouse is a lighthouse located in Kihnu, an island in the northern Gulf of Riga in Pärnu County, in Estonia.

The lighthouse was prefabricated in England; and assembled in 1865. The lighthouse uses a Fresnel lens, with the lighthouse's structure made out of tapered cast iron, painted white with the lantern dome painted in red. The lighthouse has a glare configuration of: two 1.5 s glares every 12 s.

See also 

 List of lighthouses in Estonia

References

External links 

 

Lighthouses completed in 1865
Resort architecture in Estonia
Lighthouses in Estonia
Kihnu Parish
Buildings and structures in Pärnu County